Uralic–Yukaghir, also known as Uralo-Yukaghir, is a proposed language family composed of Uralic and Yukaghir.

Uralic is a large and diverse family of languages spoken in northern and eastern Europe and northwestern Siberia. Among the better-known Uralic languages are Finnish, Estonian, and Hungarian.

Yukaghir is a small family of languages spoken in eastern Siberia. It formerly extended over a much wider area (Collinder 1965:30). It consists of two surviving languages, Tundra Yukaghir and Kolyma Yukaghir.

Proponents of the Uralo-Siberian language family include Uralo-Yukaghir as one of its two branches, alongside the Siberian languages (Nivkh, (formerly) Chukotko-Kamchatkan and Eskimo-Aleut).

History 

Similarities between Uralic and Yukaghir were first pointed out by Paasonen (1907) and Lewy (1928), although they did not consider these to be sufficient evidence for a genetic relationship between the two. Holger Pedersen (1931) included Uralic and Yukaghir in his proposed Nostratic language family, and also noted some similarities between them. A genetic relationship between Uralic and Yukaghir was first argued for in detail in 1940, independently by Karl Bouda and Björn Collinder. The hypothesis was further elaborated by Collinder in subsequent publications, and also by other scholars including Harms (1977), Nikolaeva (1988) and Piispanen (2013).

Uralic–Yukaghir is listed as a language family in A Guide to the World's Languages by Merritt Ruhlen (1987), and is accepted as a unit in controversial long-range proposals such as "Eurasiatic" by Joseph Greenberg (2000, 2002) and "Nostratic" by Allan Bomhard (2008), both based on evidence collected by earlier scholars like Collinder.

Proposed evidence 
Collinder based his case for a genetic relationship between Uralic and Yukaghir on lexical and grammatical evidence; the latter included according to him similarities between pronouns, nominal case suffixes, and verb inflection.

The following list of lexical correspondences is taken from Nikolaeva (2006).

The following list of lexical correspondences is taken from Aikio (2019).

In Yukaghir numbers also share similarities such as Proto-Uralic "ükte/*ikte" and Yukaghir "irke" 'one' and Tundra Yukaghir kiti 'two' resembles Mansi kitiγ 'two' and proto-Uralic *käktä 'two'.

Many other common words are similar in Yukaghir and Uralic, such as Proto-Yukaghir kin 'who' and Proto-Uralic ke/ki 'who'.

Criticism 

The Uralic–Yukaghir hypothesis is rejected by many researchers as unsupported. While most agree that there is a core of common vocabulary that cannot be simply dismissed as chance resemblances, it has been argued that these are not the result of common inheritance, but rather due to contact between Yukaghir and Uralic speakers, which resulted in borrowing of vocabulary from Uralic languages (especially Samoyedic) into Yukaghir. Rédei (1999) assembled a large corpus of what he considered as loans from Uralic into Yukaghir. Häkkinen (2012) argues that the grammatical systems show too few convincing resemblances, especially the morphology, and proposes that putative Uralic–Yukaghir cognates are in fact borrowings from an early stage of Uralic (c. 3000 BC; he dates Proto-Uralic to c. 2000 BC) into an early stage of Yukaghir, while Uralic was (according to him) spoken near the Sayan region and Yukaghir near the Upper Lena River and near Lake Baikal. Aikio (2014) agrees with Rédei and Häkkinen that Uralic–Yukaghir is unsupported and implausible, and that common vocabulary shared by the two families is best explained as the result of borrowing from Uralic into Yukaghir, although he rejects many of their (especially Rédei's) examples as spurious or accidental resemblances and puts the date of borrowing much later, arguing that the loanwords he accepts as valid were borrowed from an early stage of Samoyedic (preceding Proto-Samoyedic; thus roughly in the 1st millennium BC) into Yukaghir, in the same general region between the Yenisei River and Lake Baikal.

Criticism of the loaning theory 
Usually when words are borrowed, the amount of nouns borrowed is much higher than the amount of verbs, but Yukaghir-Uralic correspondences words can be found in large numbers in all word classes. Most Uralic-Yukaghir correspondences are also found in the core vocabulary and do not appear to clearly constitute a particular cultural subgroup of borrowed vocabulary of any given chronological period or culture. 

Uralic correspondences are found very extensively in function words and in the most used vocabulary which, as is well-known, is very rarely borrowed. In particular, demonstrative pronouns, personal pronouns, numbers, kinship terms, and many verbs - these kinds of words are very rarely borrowed from other languages and are very resistant to loaning. Also everyday prestige words are very rarely loaned, as an example Yukaghir first and second person singular pronouns: mət ‘I’ and tət ‘you' seem to be related to the Proto-Uralic words: *mE/*mon ‘I’ and *tE/*ton ‘you,’. Also the Uralic -i- infix may also be found in Yukaghir: 1st person. pl. mit ‘we’ and 2nd person. pl. tit ‘you’. Thus giving evidence for a direct relationship instead of a sprachbund.

Urheimat
According to Vladimir Napolskikh, the split between Finno-Ugric and Samoyedic branches might have occurred somewhere in the area between the Ob River and the Irtysh River, following an earlier split between Proto-Uralic and Proto-Yukaghir somewhere in Eastern Siberia.

See also 
Indo-Uralic languages
Ural–Altaic languages
Uralo-Siberian languages
Borean languages

Notes

Bibliography

Works cited 

 
 Bomhard, Allan R. 2008. Reconstructing Proto-Nostratic: Comparative Phonology, Morphology, and Vocabulary, 2 volumes. Leiden: Brill.
 
 
 
 
 
 Greenberg, Joseph H. 2000. Indo-European and Its Closest Relatives: The Eurasiatic Language Family, Volume 1: Grammar. Stanford, California: Stanford University Press.
 Greenberg, Joseph H. 2002. Indo-European and Its Closest Relatives: The Eurasiatic Language Family, Volume 2: Lexicon. Stanford, California: Stanford University Press.
 Greenberg, Joseph H. 2005. Genetic Linguistics: Essays on Theory and Method, edited by William Croft. Oxford: Oxford University Press.
 
 
 
 
 
 
 
 Pedersen, Holger. 1933. "Zur Frage nach der Urverwandtschaft des Indoeuropäischen mit dem Ugrofinnischen." Mémoires de la Société finno-ougrienne 67:308–325.
 
 
 Ruhlen, Merritt. 1987. A Guide to the World's Languages, Volume 1: Classification (only volume to appear to date). Stanford, California: Stanford University Press.

Further reading 

 Angere, J. 1956. Die uralo-jukagirische Frage. Ein Beitrag zum Problem der sprachlichen Urverwandschaft. Stockholm: Almqvist & Viksell.
 Bouda, Karl. 1940. "Die finnisch-ugrisch-samojedische Schicht des Jukagirischen." Ungarische Jahrbücher 20, 80–101.
 Fortescue, Michael. 1998. Language Relations Across Bering Strait: Reappraising the Archaeological and Linguistic Evidence. London and New York: Cassell.
 Hyllested, Adam. 2010. "Internal Reconstruction vs. External Comparison: The Case of the Indo-Uralic Laryngeals." Internal Reconstruction in Indo-European, eds. J.E. Rasmussen & T. Olander, 111–136. Copenhagen: Museum Tusculanum Press.
 Janhunen, Juha. 2009. "Proto-Uralic—what, where, and when?" Suomalais-Ugrilaisen Seuran Toimituksia 258. pp. 57–78. Online article.
 Mithen, Steven. 2003. After the Ice: A Global Human History 20,000 – 5000 BC. Orion Publishing Co. 
 Nikolaeva, Irina. 1986. "Yukaghir-Altaic parallels" (in Russian). Istoriko-kul'turnye kontakty narodov altajskoj jazykovoj obshchnosti: Tezisy dolkadov XXIX sessii Postojannoj Mezhdunarodnoj Altaisticheskoj Konferencii PIAC, Vol. 2: Lingvistika, pp. 84–86. Tashkent: Akademija Nauk.
 Nikolaeva, Irina. 1987. "On the reconstruction of Proto-Yukaghir: Inlaut consonantism" (in Russian). Jazyk-mif-kul'tura narodov Sibir, 43–48. Jakutsk: JaGU.
 Nikolaeva, Irina. 1988. "On the correspondence of Uralic sibilants and affricates in Yukaghir" (in Russian). Sovetskoe Finnougrovedenie 2, 81–89.
 Rédei, K. 1990. "Zu den uralisch-jukagirischen Sprachkontakten." Congressus septimus internationalis Fenno-Ugristarum. Pars 1 A. Sessiones plenares, 27–36. Debrecen.
 Sauvegeot, Au. 1963. "L'appartenance du youkaguir." Ural-altaische Jahrbücher 35, 109–117.
 Sauvegeot, Au. 1969. "La position du youkaguir." Ural-altaische Jahrbücher 41, 344–359.
 Swadesh, Morris. 1962. "Linguistic relations across the Bering Strait." American Anthropologist 64, 1262–1291.
 Tailleur, O.G. 1959. "Plaidoyer pour le youkaghir, branche orientale de la famille ouralienne." Lingua 6, 403–423.

External links 
 Bibliography at Online Documentation of Kolyma Yukaghir by Irina Nikolaeva

 
Proposed language families
Uralic languages
Paleosiberian languages
Yukaghir languages